Terence Blackburn is an American jurist and academic.  He has served as dean of the MSU College of Law and Whitehead School of Diplomacy at Seton Hall University.

References

Living people
Seton Hall University faculty
Michigan State University faculty
Year of birth missing (living people)